"Sex Over the Phone" is a song recorded by American disco group Village People, released as the first single from their ninth album, Sex Over the Phone (1985). It reached number 59 on the UK Singles Chart. The BBC banned the song because of its content - credit card dirty phone calls.

Content
The lyrics deal with phone sex, and the video for the song has become an internet phenomenon. The song reflects the overall theme of the Village People album Sex Over the Phone, which are "safer sex" practices. There are two versions of this song: the original (4:22) version has a mid-tempo beat, and the club versions (6:26 and 4:15) have a faster beat.

Charts

References

1985 singles
Village People songs
Hi-NRG songs
Songs written by Jacques Morali
Casablanca Records singles
Songs written by Fred Zarr
Songs about telephone calls
Songs written by Bruce Vilanch
1985 songs
Songs banned by the BBC